The 2012 Metro Atlantic Athletic Conference baseball tournament took place from May 24 through 27.  The top four regular season finishers of the league's  teams met in the double-elimination tournament held at Siena's Joseph L. Bruno Stadium in Troy, NY.   won their second consecutive, and third overall, tournament championship and earned the conference's automatic bid to the 2012 NCAA Division I baseball tournament.

Seeding
The top four teams were seeded one through four based on their conference winning percentage.  They then played a double-elimination tournament.

Results

All-Tournament Team
The following players were named to the All-Tournament Team.

Most Valuable Player
Taylor Sewitt was named Tournament Most Valuable Player.  Sewitt was a pitcher for Manhattan.

References

Tournament
Metro Atlantic Athletic Conference Baseball Tournament